Naya Muluk is a geographical region of Nepal, which is situated western-south part in Nepal. The Terai land between Kali River to Rapti River called "Naya Muluk" after 1860.

History

After Anglo-Nepalese War in 1814-1816, Nepal was forced to sign a treaty called Sugauli Treaty in which Nepal lost one third part of geographical territory. The geographical territory was sectioned in five parts as below:
  The whole of the lowlands between the Rivers Kali and Rapti.
 The whole of the low lands lying between the Rapti and the Gunduck.
 The whole of the lowlands between the Gunduck and Coosah.
 All the low lands between the Rivers Mitchee and the Teestah.
 All the territories within the hills east of the River Mitchee and all territories west of Kali.

Section: 2 and 3 (whole land from Rapti to Gundak and Gandak to Koshi) restored back to Nepal on December 11, 1816.

Section: 1 (whole low land between the Rivers Kali and Rapti) returned in 1860 called Naya Muluk.

Territory

Naya muluk contains two district of Sudurpashchim province and two  district of Lumbini Province.

References

External links
 A map by survey of India of 1934 showing Naya Mulk
 https://www.spotlightnepal.com/2018/11/13/centenary-end-first-world-war-celebrations-all-over-world-except-nepal/
http://himalaya.socanth.cam.ac.uk/collections/journals/contributions/pdf/CNAS_02_01_13.pdf
Nationalism and Ethnic Conflict in Nepal: Identities and Mobilization After 1990
https://www.tandfonline.com/doi/abs/10.1080/09700160802309233
Raja Pratap Vikram Shah vs Kr. Upendra Bahadur Shah And Ors. on 15 September, 1951

History of Nepal
Sudurpashchim Province
Geography of Lumbini Province
Jung Bahadur Rana
1860 in Nepal